Sen Yoluna... Ben Yoluma... (You Go Your Way... I'll Go Mine...) is the second studio album by Turkish singer Hande Yener. It was released on 17 July 2002 by Erol Köse Exclusive. The album was Yener's first major work since the release of her first studio album Senden İbaret. As of 2013, Poll Production has acquired the rights for publishing the album.

The album was first her first work published by Erol Köse Exclusive. For her previous album, she had mainly worked with Altan Çetin, while for this one she collaborated with Alper Narman and Fettah Can. Yener also re-performed a new version of the song "Duyduk Duymadık Demeyin" for this album. It was originally performed by Özdemir Erdoğan and written by Sezen Cumhur Önal.
 
The album's first music video was released for the song "Sen Yoluna... Ben Yoluma...", followed by three other music videos for the songs "Şansın Bol Olsun", "Evlilik Sandalı" and "Küs". The successful promotions together with the release of music videos made Hande Yener's second studio album one of the best-selling works of the year. It received two different awards at the Kral TV Video and Music Awards, organized by Kral TV. After selling 1,000,000 copies, the album received a platinum certification at the MÜ-YAP Music Awards. The songs in this album were performed by Yener at numerous award ceremonies, including Kral TV Video and Music Awards, and also on Star TV's program Hande Yener Show, which was presented by Yener herself.

Background and recording 
After the release of her debut studio album, some critics commented that Yener was an artist performing only one type of song. She responded to the criticism by saying: "Time will show them the facts. I will never be an artist with one type of song!". Meanwhile, it was reported that she had started working on her second studio album.

Music videos 
The first music video of the album was made for the dance version of the song "Sen Yoluna... Ben Yoluma..." and released on 17 July 2002. In the video, Yener appeared with a new image and two actors accompanied her. The album's second music video, "Şansın Bol Olsun", was released on 31 October 2002. The video was taken by a crowded team at a bar. Four months after the release of "Şansın Bol Olsun", the third music video, "Evlilik Sandalı", was released on 18 February 2003. A male model appeared alongside Yener in the video, and she went in front of the camera in a wedding dress. Later on 2 June 2003, the album's fourth and last music video, "Küs", was released. The music video was directed by Nihat Odabaşı and recorded at a beach.

Critical reception 

Sen Yoluna... Ben Yoluma... received positive reviews from music critics and radiomen. Radio personality Michael Kuyucu gave a positive review for the album and stated: "Hande Yener proved that she is not an artist with only one type of song. [...] Yener, who made an excellent debut in her first solo work and almost became a pop star, has shown the same success in her second solo work."

Track listing

Personnel 
Credits adapted from Sen Yoluna... Ben Yoluma...s album booklet.

 
 Erol Köse Exclusive - production, press and public relations, distribution
 Erol Köse - producer
 Hande Yener - vocals, songwriter
 Altan Çetin - songwriter, composer, arranger
 Onur Mete - songwriter, composer
 Alper Narman - songwriter, composer
 Fettah Can - songwriter, composer
 Sezen Cumhur Önal - songwriter
 Vasilis Vasileiadis - composer
 Özgür Yedievli - arranger
 Alper Erinç - arranger
 Çağlar Türkmen- mastering
 Erdinç Şenyaylar - guitar, bouzouki, oud
 Murat Yeter - arranger
 Selim Çaldıran - arranger
 Yaşar Akpençe - rhythm
 Cihan Okan - backing vocals
 Sinan Akçıl - arranger
 Grup Gündem - violin
 Hüsnü Şenlendirici - clarinet, trumpet
 Yeşim Vatan - backing vocals
 Ozan Çolakoğlu - arranger
 Sibel Gürsoy - backing vocals
 Cengiz Ercümer - rhythm, percussion
 Mehmet Akatay - rhythm, percussion

 Erdem Sökmen - guitar
 Ercan Irmak - ney
 Ercüment Vural - backing vocals
 Murat Boz - backing vocals
 Aytaç Mısırlı - qanun
 Seyfi Ayta - percussion
 Göksel Kartal - qanun
 Yıldıran Güz - oud
 Kirpi Bülent - clarinet
 Berna Keser - backing vocals
 Özer Özel - Turkish tambur
 Bekir Ünlüataer - backing vocals
 Kadir Verim - kemenche
 Tolga Görsev - electro guitar, backing vocals
 Özcan Şenyaylar - violin
 Sevim Yiğit - backing vocals
 Aylin Şenyaylar - backing vocals
 Türker Dinletir - ney
 Murat Ejder - bass guitar
 Kadir Okyay - string instruments group
 Şaban Gölge - string instruments groups
 Sevim, Adnan, Nida - backing vocals
 Nihat Odabaşı - photographs
 Sanart - graphics
 FRS Matbaacılık - printing

References

External links 
Sen Yoluna... Ben Yoluma... – Discogs

2002 albums
Hande Yener albums